Mahuteh (also Romanized as Māhūteh) is a village in Cham Kabud Rural District, Sarab Bagh District, Abdanan County, Ilam Province, Iran. At the 2006 census, its population was 173, in 33 families. The village is populated by Lurs.

References 

Populated places in Abdanan County
Luri settlements in Ilam Province